Hyde Memorial State Park is a state park of New Mexico, United States, located  northeast of Santa Fe in the Sangre de Cristo Mountains.  Summertime activities include hiking and camping, the park is popular for tubing on the snow-covered hillsides in the winter.

The park was listed on the National Register of Historic Places in 2021.

References

External links
 Hyde Memorial State Park

State parks of New Mexico
Parks in Santa Fe County, New Mexico
Protected areas established in 1938
National Register of Historic Places in Santa Fe County, New Mexico